Snow Lake lithium mine is a lithium mine located on a 55,000-acre site 400 miles north of Winnipeg, Canada. Notably, the mine will be operated using 100% electric power, via hydropower and electric equipment. The mine expects to process the lithium ore into 6% spodumene. It signed a memorandum of understanding to supply Korean battery maker LG, at a nearby hydroxide processing plant.

The company expects to supply around 160,000 tonnes of spodumene/year. The mine is planned to open in 2025 or 2026.

It is a hard rock mine rather than processing lithium brine.

Electric mining equipment is to be supplied by Swedish company Epiroc.

The mine's 160,000 ton output is sufficient to make batteries for around 500,000 electric cars annually.

The site is near the Arctic Gateway railway which offers efficient transport to US manufacturing centers.

Company 
Snow Lake Resources Ltd. ($LTIM) is a public company formed in 2018. The land was acquired in 2016 by Australian exploration company Nova Minerals Ltd., Snow Lake Lithium's majority shareholder.

References

External links 

 
 

Lithium mines in Canada